The 2022–23 Nebraska Cornhuskers women's basketball represents the University of Nebraska in the 2022–23 college basketball season. Led by seventh year head coach Amy Williams, the team plays their games at the Pinnacle Bank Arena and are members of the Big Ten Conference.

Schedule and results

|-
!colspan=12 style=|Exhibition

|-
!colspan=12 style=|Regular season

|-
! colspan=6 style=| Big Ten Tournament

Rankings

See also
 2022–23 Nebraska Cornhuskers men's basketball team

References

Nebraska Cornhuskers women's basketball seasons
Nebraska Cornhuskers
Nebraska Cornhuskers women's basketball
Nebraska Cornhuskers women's basketball